The Fish Creek Mountains are a mountain range in Lander County, Nevada.

References 

Mountain ranges of Nevada
Mountain ranges of Lander County, Nevada